Mildred Robinson Hermann (February 28, 1891 – March 16, 1964) was an American lawyer. She was the first woman lawyer in Juneau, Alaska. Hermann has been called the "Queen Mother of the Alaskan Statehood," due to her leadership in Alaska becoming a state. She was a signer of the Alaska State Constitution. In 2009, she was named to the Alaska Women's Hall of Fame.

Early life and education

Mildred Robinson was born in 1891 in Indiana. She moved to Alaska in 1919.

Work

Hermann would testify on Capitol Hill on behalf of Alaska Statehood in 1950.

Later life and legacy

She died in Juneau in 1964. In 2009, she was named to the Alaska Women's Hall of Fame.

References

1891 births
1964 deaths
Alaska lawyers
Alaska Republicans
Burials at Evergreen Cemetery (Juneau, Alaska)
Delegates to Alaska's Constitutional Convention
People from Shelby County, Indiana
People from Valdez, Alaska
Women in Alaska politics
20th-century American women lawyers
20th-century American lawyers